Prototheora geniculata is a species of moth of the family Prototheoridae. It is found in South Africa, where it known only from the Schoemanspoort in the Cape Province, which is located in a southern extension of the Karoo desert, generally referred to as the Little Karoo.

The wingspan is 14–17 mm. Adults have been recorded in mid-March.

Etymology
The specific epithet is derived from the Latin geniculatus (meaning like the bent knee) as suggested by the sharply bent, subapical portion of the male valva.

References

Endemic moths of South Africa
Hepialoidea
Moths of Africa
Moths described in 1996
Taxa named by Donald R. Davis (entomologist)